Luke Harrington-Myers (born 4 May 2001) is a Caymanian cricketer. In August 2019, he was named in the Cayman Islands cricket team's Twenty20 International (T20I) squad for the Regional Finals of the 2018–19 ICC T20 World Cup Americas Qualifier tournament. He made his T20I debut for the Cayman Islands against the United States on 19 August 2019.

References

External links
 

2001 births
Living people
Caymanian cricketers
Cayman Islands Twenty20 International cricketers
Cricketers from Kingston upon Thames